Accanthopus velikensis is a species of darkling beetle belonging to the family Tenebrionidae subfamily Tenebrioninae.

Synonyms
Dendarus latissimus  Stierlin, 1902 
Enoplopus dentipes  (Rossi) Porta, 1934 
Enoplopus velikensis  (Piller & Mitterpacher) Solier, 1848 
Helops dentipes  Rossi, 1790 
Tenebrio caraboides  Petagna, 1786 nec Linnaeus, 1758

Description

Very characteristic is the tooth on the inner edge of the front femora (hence the Latin word dentipes in the synonym Enoplopus dentipes). The adults live under the bark of trees and old stumps.

Ecology
The adults live under the bark of trees and old stumps.

Distribution
These beetles are mainly present in Albania, Bulgaria, Croatia, France, Italy, Greece and Romania.

References

Tenebrionidae
Beetles of Europe
Beetles described in 1783